Cropping is the removal of a person's ears as an act of physical punishment.  It was performed along with the pillorying or immobilisation in the stocks, and sometimes alongside punishments such as branding or fines.  The punishment is described in Victor Hugo's The Hunchback of Notre-Dame.

Description 
Cropping sometimes occurred as a standalone punishment (such as in the case of William Prynne for seditious libel), where criminals' ears would be cut off with a blade.  Cropping was also a secondary punishment to having criminals' ears nailed to the pillory (with the intention that their body movements would tear them off).  In 1538 Thomas Barrie spent a whole day with his ears nailed to the pillory in Newbury, England, before having them cut off to release him.

History 
Cropping is mentioned in ancient Assyrian law and the Babylonian Code of Hammurabi.

Cropping was quite rare in England, but more common in Guernsey. Notable cases of cropping in England include Thomas Barrie in 1538, who reputedly died from shock following his cropping, and John Bastwick, William Prynne, and Henry Burton in 1637. In the 16th century, Henry VIII amended the laws on vagrancy to decree that first offences would be punished with three days in the stocks, second offences with cropping, and third offences with hanging.

Records show that croppings took place in the United States in the late 18th century, particularly in states such as Pennsylvania and Tennessee.
 
From page 153 of Reverend Samuel Peters' General History of Connecticut, written during the colonial period, there is this account:

In Rhode Island, cropping was a punishment for crimes such as counterfeiting money, perjury, and "burning houses, barns, and outbuildings" (but not amounting to arson). Cropping (along with the pillory and stocks) was abolished in Tennessee in 1829, with abolition further afield starting from approximately 1839.

See also
Cropping (animal)

Footnotes

Sources 

 
 
 
 
 
 
 
 
 
 
 

Corporal punishments
Mutilation